Aleksandar Bratić (born 4 April 1972) is a retired Bosnian-Herzegovinian football player.

Career
Bratić was born in Trebinje, then Yugoslavia now Bosnia and Herzegovina, and started to play with local side FK Leotar playing with them in the Yugoslav Second League between 1988 and 1992. Due to the start of the war, Bratić moved to Serbia and joined Hajduk Kula playing in the First League of FR Yugoslavia. During the 1990s, he would represent several other clubs in Serbia, namely FK Rad, OFK Beograd and the former European Champions Red Star Belgrade. He left Yugoslavia in January 2000 for Iraklis. In summer 2000, he moved to Switzerland and joined Servette FC playing with them for almost an entire decade. He last played for Grand-Lancy FC in the 2009–10 Swiss 1. Liga.

National team
He was a member of the Yugoslav U-18 national team, and after the break-up of Yugoslavia he became a member of the Bosnia and Herzegovina national team having made one appearance for them.

Personal life 
Bratić is of Bosnian Serb origin.

Honours
Red Star
Cup of FR Yugoslavia: 1997

Servette
Swiss Cup: 2001

References

External links
 Football.ch

1972 births
Living people
People from Trebinje
Serbs of Bosnia and Herzegovina
Bosnia and Herzegovina footballers
Bosnia and Herzegovina expatriate footballers
Bosnia and Herzegovina expatriate sportspeople in Switzerland
FK Leotar players
FK Hajduk Kula players
FK Rad players
Red Star Belgrade footballers
OFK Beograd players
First League of Serbia and Montenegro players
Iraklis Thessaloniki F.C. players
Servette FC players
Swiss Super League players
Expatriate footballers in Greece
Expatriate footballers in Switzerland
Association football defenders
Grand-Lancy FC players
CS Chênois players